{{Infobox Boxingmatch
|fight date    = April 9, 2016
|Fight Name    = Manny Pacquiao vs. Timothy Bradley III
|image         = 
|location      = MGM Grand Garden Arena, Paradise, Nevada, U.S.
|fighter1      = Manny Pacquiao
|nickname1     = Pac-Man
|record1       = 57–6–2 (38 KO)
|hometown1     = Sarangani Province, Philippines
|height1       =5 ft 5+1/2 in
|style1       = Southpaw
|weight1       = 145+1/2 lb
|recognition1  = [[Ring Magazine pound for pound|The Ring]] No. 7 ranked pound-for-pound fighter8-division world champion
|fighter2      = Timothy Bradley
|style2 = Orthodox
|nickname2     = Desert Storm
|record2       = 33–1–1 (13 KO)
|hometown2     = Palm Springs, California, U.S.
|height2       = 5 ft 6 in
|weight2       = 146+1/2 lb
|recognition2  = The Ring No. 9 ranked pound-for-pound fighter2-division world champion
|titles        = vacant WBO International welterweight title
|result        =  Pacquiao wins via 12-round unanimous decision (116-110, 116-110, 116-110)
}}
Manny Pacquiao vs. Timothy Bradley III, was a professional boxing match for the vacant lineal world championship and WBO International welterweight title. It was held on April 9, 2016 at the MGM Grand Garden Arena in Las Vegas. The bout was on HBO PPV, according to Pacquiao, it was  his last fight as a professional. The winner of the bout would also be awarded a Special WBO commemorative title belt, which was billed to be a "Legacy Belt".

Pacquiao knocked Bradley down twice and outpointed him throughout the fight, winning by unanimous decision after all three judges scored the bout in his favor, 116-110. According to CompuBox, Pacquiao landing 28% [122/439] of his punches thrown and 46% of his power punches thrown [92/201], in comparison to Bradley's 33% [99/302] of punches landed and 40% [87/218] of power punches thrown.

National Anthem Singers
United States (The Star-Spangled Banner) – Trent Harmon
Philippines (Lupang Hinirang) – The Word Choir

Referee and judges

Tony Weeks served as the third man in the ring whilst the judges who scored the bout and decided its outcome provided it go the full 12-round distance were: Burt Clements (Las Vegas), Dave Moretti (Las Vegas) and Steve Weisfeld (New Jersey).

Fight Recap

Round 1: Pacquiao nearly halfway across the ring when the bell rings, looking to be the aggressor. The fighters circle one another, pawing with jabs. Bradley connects with a left jab to the face. Not much action so far. Cheers of "Manny! Manny!" but the crowd then quiets, waiting for a landed punch. A strangely quiet round in the arena and a hard one to score at that. (Bryan Armen Graham of The Guardian scores it 10-9 Bradley)Round 2: A tactical opening from Pacquiao, trying to cut off the ring but Bradley uses shifty lateral movement to subvert the efforts. A nice inside uppercut by Bradley followed by an inside hook. Good shot by the American. Pacquiao fires back with a one-two combo but Bradley darts safely out of range. Bradley misses and Pacquiao counters inside with a compact left hand. (Bryan Armen Graham of The Guardian scores it 10-9 Bradley)Round 3: Pacquiao throws a left with bad intentions that just Bradley nearly swerves but it connects. The fighters are opening up in the third and the crowd is loving it. Bradley misses wildly with a hook, but connects with a vicious right. Still awfully quiet in between the exchanges. Pacquiao showing good hand speed when he throws, using the jab with better effect here. Bradley with throws a left to the abdomen. (Bryan Armen Graham of The Guardian scores it 10-9 Pacquiao)Round 4: Both fighters throwing if not landing more in bursts of action. Pacquiao throws a series of quick combinations upstairs with Bradley absorbing some and parrying the rest. A stinging left hand for Pacquiao, his best punch of the fight. Thirty seconds remain in the round and Pacquiao is opening up. A great round for the Filipino and an interesting first act. (Bryan Armen Graham of The Guardian of HBO Sports scores it 10-9 Pacquiao)Round 5: Bradley has backed Pacquiao up along the ropes and opens fire, connecting with a chopping right. A right-left combination for Bradley and now the crowd is cheering his name. But here comes Pacquiao – out of nowhere! He's pouring it on in the center of the ring and bringing the crowd to its feet as they trade left hooks. Manny is lighting Bradley up with rapid-fire combinations. And it makes the crowd goes crazy (Bryan Armen Graham of The Guardian scores it 10-9 Pacquiao)Round 6: A slow start flurry by Bradley gets Manny's attention. Just over a minute left and Pacquiao darts in with another combo and the crowd screams with delight. A nice combo upstairs by Bradley but uncertain as to how cleanly it landed. A very close round that could go either way and one of several swing rounds that could see scores all over the map if it goes the full 12 rounds. Manny looks faster and is starting to find his range. (Bryan Armen Graham of The Guardian scores it 10-9 Pacquiao)Round 7: Pacquiao strikes first with a left-right combo upstairs and then darts outside before Bradley can answer. Bradley is measuring and using head movement to keep Pacquiao at bay. A short hook landed by Pacquiao and Bradley goes down – a flash knockdown that could have been a slip, yet the referee's ruling stands. (Bryan Armen Graham of The Guardian scores it 10-8 Pacquiao)Round 8: A slow start quickly gives way to more two-way action. A right hand by Bradley but Pacquiao answers with a flurry of punches. Bradley tags Pacquiao with a massive right hand that stops him in his tracks. Pacquiao is hurt! The crowd is rocking, cheering for Manny but also chanting for Bradley. Pacquiao in full retreat. Best round of the fight for the American. (Bryan Armen Graham of The Guardian scores it 10-9 Bradley)Round 9: Bradley lands an uppercut to start the ninth, but the pace has slowed. A surprise counter left in the center of the ring from Pacquiao lands flush and drops Bradley to the canvas. The entire crowd of 14,655 is on their feet. A wonderful counter punch that almost sends Bradley into a reverse somersault as he crashes to the canvas. Bradley is hurt! He beats the count and makes it to the bell. (Bryan Armen Graham of The Guardian scores it 10-8 Pacquiao)Round 10: Bradley's missing wildly. Pacquiao not making him pay with every miss but he's doing enough to score, mostly with left hands. Nothing from Bradley this round. It's looking more and more like Manny's round. (Bryan Armen Graham of The Guardian scores it 10-9 Pacquiao)Round 11: Bradley is now circling Pacquiao and reverted to pawing with the jab. Pacquiao darting left to right and picking his spots, not pressing the attack. Bradley lands a right that moves Pacquiao back a bit, but that's just about it. Not the most lopsided round but Pacquiao did more. (Bryan Armen Graham of The Guardian scores it 10-9 Pacquiao)Round 12 | The Final Round: Bradley lands a counter right. Crowd on their feet with a minute left – Pacquiao tries to lunge in but Bradley wraps him up. A hard shot by Pacquiao rattles Bradley near the end but Bradley nicks the final frame on activity. (Bryan Armen Graham of The Guardian scores it 10-9 Bradley)Upshot:'' Manny Pacquiao beats Timothy Bradley via unanimous decision (116-110, 116-110, 116-110) with Bryan Armen Graham also scoring in his favor, 116-110.

Official Scorecards

Fight card

International broadcasting

External links
 Official website

References

Bradley
2016 in boxing
Boxing in Las Vegas
2016 in sports in Nevada
Boxing on HBO
April 2016 sports events in the United States
MGM Grand Garden Arena